Félicité was a 32-gun frigate of the French Navy, lead ship of her class. Captured by the British Royal Navy and sold to the State of Haiti, she entered Haitian service as Améthyste.

French service
In 1786, Félicité served as division flagship for Chef d'escadre Pâris de Soulanges in the 12-ship Escadre d'évolution. She was at Cherbourg when a naval review and a simulated naval battle took place as Louis XVI visited the harbour.

In 1792, Félicité traveled to the Caribbean Sea.

They captured , which they sent back to France, and another Sierra Leone Company ship, which they destroyed. These were only two of the many vessels the squadron captured.

On 6 February 1806, Fėlicitė was present at the Battle of San Domingo, from which she escaped unharmed together with two other French vessels, the 36-gun frigate  and the 20-gun ship-corvette .

The frigates  and Félicité, and the corvette Diligente captured and burned the American vessel Lark, Moore, master, which was sailing from Philadelphia to Jamaica.

In February 1809, she sailed with Troude's division to the Caribbean, armed en flûte.

In May, British ships chased two French frigates, armed en flûte and bringing supplies to Martinique, into the Basse Terre roads. By this time HMS Unique, was in poor condition – in particular she was leaky, in part from the constant firing of her guns at shore batteries. The decision was made to use her as a fireship in an attempt to destroy one or both of the French vessels. On 31 May she was sent in during the evening but the mission failed. Having been lightened of most of her stores, Unique was vulnerable to gusts of wind, and she grounded not far from one of her targets. Her captain then set fire to a train of explosives to prevent her falling into French hands. Félicité and Furieuse escaped some time later, only to end up being captured.  captured Furieuse on 5 July; Félicités French service lasted only a few months longer.

On 18 June,  and  captured Félicité. At the time of her capture, Félicité was armed with only 14 guns, but had 174 men on board. She had left Guadeloupe in company with another frigate. They were sailing to France with colonial produce. The frigate escaped through superior sailing despite Cherub having conducted a long chase.

The British sold the vessel to Henri Christophe's State of Haiti the next month. The Haitians renamed her Améthyste.

Haitian service

For reasons unknown, in January 1812, the Haitian Navy defected to the rebel Jérôme Maximilien Borgella, who placed a French privateer named Gaspard in command of Améthyste (recommissioned as Heureuse Réunion), a corvette, and a brig. Gaspard armed the flagship with 44 cannon and a crew of over 600 men including Haitians, Frenchmen, and Americans.

Stopped soon thereafter upon suspicion of piracy by Captain James Yeo, commanding , Heureuse Réunion began the action of 3 February 1812. Unable to close fast enough to board the more nimble Southampton and losing her mainmast, Heureuse Réunion surrendered and was dragged to Jamaica, where the British returned to the ownership of Haiti.

Notes

Citations

References
 
 

Age of Sail frigates of France
Ships built in France
Félicité-class frigates
1785 ships
Captured ships
Pirate ships
Maritime incidents in 1794
Naval ships of Haiti